WN may refer to:

 WN postcode area, England
 Southwest Airlines (IATA code WN)
 WeatherNation TV
 White nationalism
 White noise (disambiguation)
 Wikinews, a sister project of Wikipedia
 Willesden TMD, a railway depot in north London, England
 Wisconsin Northern Railroad (reporting mark WN)
 WordNet, a semantic lexicon for the English language
 World News (disambiguation)
 Web novel
 WN catalogue, a catalogue of works by Frédéric Chopin
 Tungsten nitride, an inorganic compound with formula WN